Snead (also Sneads) is an unincorporated community in Columbia County, Georgia, United States.

Notes

Unincorporated communities in Columbia County, Georgia
Unincorporated communities in Georgia (U.S. state)